Jabbar Singh Sankhala is an Indian politician from the Bharatiya Janata Party and a member of 15th Rajasthan Legislative Assembly representing the Asind Vidhan Sabha constituency of Rajasthan.

References 

1968 births
Living people
Rajasthan MLAs 2018–2023